This is a list of all books based on the Wishbone TV series.  All were children's novels published under the Big Red Chair Books moniker of Lyrick Studios.

Wishbone Classics
Wishbone Classics is the first tie-in series to the Wishbone TV series. The books are straight adaptations of the original stories that inspired episodes of the show, with commentary and trivia by Wishbone on the side.

The Adventures of Wishbone
The Adventures of Wishbone is the second tie-in series to the Wishbone TV series. The books are based on the structure of the original TV series, switching back and forth between Wishbone's life in Oakdale and the events of the story of which he is being reminded.  Several are direct adaptions of television episodes, while others tell stories not touched by the TV series.

The Super Adventures of Wishbone
The Super Adventures of Wishbone is a spinoff of The Adventures of Wishbone, and consists of five double-length books in the style of the original series.

The Wishbone Mysteries
The Wishbone Mysteries is the third tie-in series to the Wishbone TV series. The books are based entirely around the adventures of Wishbone and his friends in Oakdale, and no longer include Wishbone imagining himself into a story. Instead, Joe, Sam or David read a mystery story, with the events of their book inspiring them as they solve a mystery in the present day. Book 2 also features Joe discovering a box of his late father's favorite mystery stories in their attic, which supplies many of the books he reads throughout the series.

Wishbone Super Mysteries
Wishbone Super Mysteries is a spinoff of The Wishbone Mysteries, and consists of four double-length books in the style of the original series.

Wishbone: The Early Years
Wishbone: The Early Years is the fourth tie-in series to the Wishbone TV series, and the first aimed at much younger readers. The books are based on the structure of the original TV series, switching back and forth between a very young Wishbone's life in Oakdale and the events of the story of which he has been reminded.

2000-2001
From 2000 to 2001, three new series were launched, all written by the same author: Wishbone Adventures (in the style of The Adventures of Wishbone), Wishbone Mysteries (in the style of the previous series of the same name) and Wishbone: Tales of a Pup (in the style of Wishbone: The Early Years). A total of nine books were published before the series was ultimately canceled.

Wishbone Adventures

Wishbone Mysteries

Wishbone: Tales of a Pup

Wishbone, Based on
Books based on television series
Novel series